Mbya may refer to:
 Mbayá, a historic ethnic group of Paraguay, Bolivia and Brazil
 Mbyá Guaraní people, an ethnic group of Paraguay, Brazil, Argentina, and Uruguay
 Mbyá Guaraní language, a Gurani language of Argentina, Brazil, and Paraguay
 Sirionó language, a Guarayu language of Bolivia

See also
 Kadiweu language or Mbayá, a Guaicuruan language of Brazil
 Mbia (disambiguation)

Language and nationality disambiguation pages